Todo Por Tu Amor (English title: Everything for your love) is a Venezuelan telenovela produced by Venevisión in 1997. It was developed by Alberto Gómez based on the original argument of the telenovela Ligia Sandoval written by Delia Fiallo.

On January 22, 1997, Venevisión started broadcasting Todo por tu amor weekdays at 9:00pm, replacing Sol de tentación. The last episode was broadcast on July 8, 1997, with Contra viento y marea replacing it the following day.

Jeannette Rodríguez and Jean Carlo Simancas starred as the main protagonists, while Hilda Abrahamz and Gabriela Spanic starred as antagonists.

Plot
Marina Rangel is a courageous and young physical therapist struggling to support her family by working at a public hospital. Here, she will meet the rich and handsome Dr. Samuel Montalbán, and this is where all her troubles will begin. Dr. Samuel forms an instant dislike for Marina and finds an excuse to have her fired. Finding herself jobless and desperate, Marina finds a job as a nurse in a private home caring for a woman who has recently become blind. However, her patient is none other than Andrea, Samuel's frustrated and conniving wife who makes everyone around her, especially Marina, suffer due to her handicap.

It is in the middle of this conflict that Marina and Samuel form a passionate bond of love, but their happiness will face many challenges. Andrea recovers her sight but hides this from Samuel in order to keep him at her side. Also, Marina's former lover comes back into her life, and it turns out that he is Samuel's brother. But when he is murdered by a jealous lover, Marina is accused of the crime. Believing that she killed his brother, Samuel abandons Marina. Years later, Marina, now married to another man, meets Samuel who assures her that their feelings for each other are over. But is it?

Cast

References

External links
 
 Promo Telenovela "Todo por tu amor" 1 (1997) at YouTube

1997 telenovelas
Venevisión telenovelas
1997 Venezuelan television series debuts
1997 Venezuelan television series endings
Venezuelan telenovelas
Spanish-language telenovelas
Television shows set in Venezuela